Eduardo Mario Ebratt Troncoso (born February 3, 1993, in Santa Marta, Colombia), better known by his stage name Lalo Ebratt, is a Colombian reggaeton singer.

Career 
He first came to public attention as a member of Trapical Minds, a latin hip-hop project put together by Colombian label RedSnapperMusic that also features singers  and Skinny Happy, before launching a solo career.

He is best known for his viral hit single "Mocca", released on April 27, 2018. The music video has garnered over 200 million views. A remixed version of "Mocca" featuring Colombian singer J Balvin was released on October 3, 2018.

Discography

Albums
 Dos Mil Treinta y Pico (2022)

Singles 
As lead artist

As featured artist

References 

1993 births
Living people
People from Santa Marta
21st-century Colombian male singers
Colombian reggaeton musicians
Universal Music Latin Entertainment artists